Potomac Review is a bi-annual American literary journal based in Rockville, Maryland. It publishes fiction, poetry, and nonfiction from established as well as emerging writers. Writers who have contributed to this journal include Amina Gautier, Seth Abramson, Jacob M. Appel, Lisa Ohlen Harris, Van G. Garrett, David Wagoner, Ned Balbo and Margaret MacInnis.

Founded in 1994, the Potomac Review is now funded by the Montgomery College Foundation and Paul Peck Humanities Institute.

References

External links
Potomac Review Website

1994 establishments in Maryland
Biannual magazines published in the United States
Literary magazines published in the United States
Magazines established in 1994
Magazines published in Maryland
Montgomery College